Mordellina stastnyi is a species of beetle in the genus Mordellina. It was described in 2012.

References

Mordellidae
Beetles described in 2012